Church of Saint Mary Magdalene in Tarnobrzeg - Miechocin the oldest church in Tarnobrzeg, and one of the oldest brick churches in Poland. Named after Jesus' companion Mary Magdalene, it was made in gothic style but it was on several occasions rebuilt in different styles.

See also
 Dzików Castle
 Tarnobrzeg's churches: Assumption of Mary, Our Lady of Perpetual Help

12th-century Roman Catholic church buildings in Poland
Miechocin
Gothic architecture in Poland